Dawa'a al-Jihad (Arabic: "Call to Struggle") was a militant university established at an Afghan refugee camp near Peshawar, Pakistan, by Abdul Rasul Sayyaf in the 1980s.

References

Soviet–Afghan War
Refugee camps in Pakistan
Afghan diaspora in Pakistan